Michael Lannan is an American screenwriter and producer. He is known as a creator and producer of the HBO series Looking. The series, about a group of gay friends in San Francisco inspired by Lannan's own life as a gay man, is based on Lorimer, a short film which Lannan produced and directed in 2011 and subsequently expanded into a feature film screenplay.

Lannan's other film and television credits include assistant producer and assistant director credits on episodes of Sons of Anarchy, Nurse Jackie, Rubicon and Damages and the film Remember Me, as well as acting and production credits on the docufiction film Interior. Leather Bar.

References

External links

American male screenwriters
American television writers
American film producers
American television producers
American film directors
American gay writers
American LGBT screenwriters
LGBT film directors
LGBT producers
Living people
American male television writers
Year of birth missing (living people)